"Me Too" is a song recorded by American singer-songwriter Meghan Trainor for her second studio album, Thank You (2016). It was written by Trainor, Eric Frederic, Jacob Kasher Hindlin, Jason Desrouleaux, Peter Svensson, and produced by Ricky Reed. The track was released on May 5, 2016, as the second single from the album. The Electro-R&B song has lyrics about self-love and self-empowerment, and urges listeners to be more content and confident in themselves. It received mixed to negative reviews, with some critics accusing Trainor of bragging.

"Me Too" was a commercial success, peaking at number 13 on the US Billboard Hot 100. It was certified quadruple platinum in Australia and Canada and triple platinum in the US. Hannah Lux Davis directed the music video for "Me Too". Released on May 9, 2016, on Vevo, Trainor requested its removal the same day due to unauthorized digital manipulation of her body. The following day, the unedited version of the video was released. It features her donning a giraffe onesie, traveling with her entourage, trying on different dresses and finishes with a dance break. Trainor has performed the song on The Tonight Show Starring Jimmy Fallon, The Today Show, Sunrise, Charts Center and Good Morning America with a live band and backup dancers. It was also performed on her The Untouchable Tour (2016).

Background and composition
Following a disagreement with label director L.A. Reid, Meghan Trainor wrote the single "No" with Jacob Kasher Hindlin and producer Ricky Reed. Ultimately, the song changed the direction of its parent album, as they started experimenting with new musical styles and produced six more tracks. "Me Too" was written by Trainor, Eric Frederic, Hindlin, Jason Desrouleaux, Peter Svensson, and produced by Reed. On May 2, 2016, Trainor tweeted that the second single from her second major-label studio album, Thank You (2016), would be released next, along with the hashtag #MeToo. She shared a still from the music video set later that day. It was digitally released on May 5. "Me Too" is written in the key of E minor in common time with a tempo of 120–126 beats per minute. Trainor's vocals range from B3 to B4.

"Me Too" is an electro and R&B song with an empowering message. The verses of the song are set to a minimalist musical bed consisting of just a bass line, finger snaps and popping mouth percussion, followed by an R&B pre-chorus. Its lyrics talk about how much Trainor loves herself, as well as "why we should all want to be like her". In a chorus, which has been described as "catchy" by Fuse's Shannon Mages, Trainor sings, "If I was you, I'd wanna be me too". According to Erin Jensen of USA Today, the song portrays Trainor's boldness and confidence, and features her "feeling herself". "Me Too" reveals the layers of Trainor's "unabashed confidence", and shows that it comes from a place of "bonafide swagger". The song focuses on gaining self-respect and confidence. Its composition has been described as a "throwback" to Psy's song "Gangnam Style" because of its "goofy giraffe costume, the dance troupe, and the tongue-in-cheek-bragging".

Critical reception
"Me Too" received mixed reviews. Newsdays Glenn Gamboa stated that Trainor rides an "elastic bass line like early-Aughts Britney Spears" on the song. Writing for andPop, Rebecca Matina opined that the incorporation of dubstep-like beats with the jazz/funk chorus did not blend together seamlessly, but made note of the "club" vibe of the verses and described the chorus as "bubbly". Alexa Camp of Slant Magazine was critical of the song, calling it a "vacant exercise in positivity, confusing delusional self-importance with self-worth". Michael Cragg of The Guardian also criticized the song, writing that its "bragging" sounds misplaced. Knoxville News Sentinels Chuck Campbell wrote that it sees Trainor stretching over elastic bass and finger-snapping, but her self-confident sass seems a bit like lip service.

Spins Dan Weiss dubbed the song "Will.i.am-goes-Sophie" and compared it to a "vibrant Gap commercial". Isabella Biedenharn of Entertainment Weekly likened the song to the album track "I Love Me", writing that they are "instant confidence-spikers, with subtle nods to those heady days when jewelry was 'ice". The New York Times Jon Caramanica gave the song a mixed review, writing that "she awkwardly proclaims self-love: 'Who's that sexy thang I see over there? / That's me, standin' in the mirror". Hazel Cills of MTV News wrote here "we find Trainor kissing her reflection in the mirror, flipping off her legion of haters, and telling persistent bachelors to back the hell off in bachelorette-party-approved retro-pop". She added the song is "club-ready" with its "throbbing bass beat". Writing for ABC News, Allan Raible stated that "Me Too", which is supposed to be a song that boosts confidence, ends up being just Trainor "bragging about the gold around her neck and how she's now a V.I.P.".

Commercial performance 
In the United States, "Me Too" debuted at number 39 on the Billboard Hot 100. It eventually reached its peak of number 13 on the chart in its 11th chart week. This week it appeared at number 4 on the Digital Songs chart, number 26 on Streaming Songs, and at number 35 on Radio Songs.  It topped the Israel Media Forest TV Airplay Chart.  In Australia, "Me Too" peaked at number four on the ARIA Charts, and spent 19 total weeks on the chart. In Canada and France, the track peaked at numbers 9 and 98, respectively. It spent 24 weeks on the former chart and 11 on the latter.

"Me Too" was also successful in Guatemala, peaking at number eight on the Monitor Latino chart. In the United Kingdom, "Me Too" peaked at number 84 on the UK Singles Chart. Other international peaks included number 62 in Germany and number 81 in Ireland. The song was certified triple platinum by the RIAA for sales in excess of 3,000,000 copies. It was also certified quadruple platinum in Australia and Canada and gold in Mexico. The song finished at numbers 51 and 57 on Australia and Argentina's respective year-end charts. Meanwhile, it placed at numbers 33 and 62 in Canada and the US.

Music video

Background and concept 

On May 9, 2016, Trainor released a music video for "Me Too", which was directed by Hannah Lux Davis. The singer contacted the head of Vevo to have it removed later that day because of unapproved digital manipulation of her body to make her waist look thinner. On Snapchat, Trainor stated she had not approved the video and "it went out for the world, so I'm embarrassed". An unedited video was released on May 10. Talking about the controversy, Trainor said, "I screamed in my hotel room, [...] I was like, 'Why would they do this?' I cried. I had to try not to cry because I had my [makeup] done, and was like, 'Don't ruin this. Go work and ignore it,' but I couldn't help it."

Synopsis
The video begins with Trainor waking up and singing the song looking in her bathroom mirror. She dons a giraffe onesie and makes her way to a photo shoot. She arrives there trying on several outfits with her entourage. She chooses a blue sequined dress and proceeds to a blue spotlit room, where she dances with a group of dancers in turquoise dresses. The last dance sequence represents the music video shoot and all the events leading up to it represent Trainor waking up and getting ready for it.

Reception 
A writer for Rolling Stone praised the video writing it "shows Trainor and her #squad cruising through Los Angeles Rebecca Black-style, wearing garish costume jewelry"; it is "just another day in the #craycray life" of Trainor's. Halle Keifer of Vulture.com also had a favourable view of the video, writing, "Meghan Trainor's out here having fabulous hair and fronting a monochromatic dance squad" and "wearing a filthy bathrobe to work instead of a giraffe onesie".

Live performances
Trainor performed "Me Too" on The Tonight Show Starring Jimmy Fallon, and on Good Morning America with a live band and backup dancers. On June 21, 2016, Trainor performed it on The Today Show. She has performed "Me Too" on Sunrise and Charts Center. The song was part of her setlists for the Jingle Ball Tour 2016 and The Untouchable Tour (2016). It also appeared on the soundtrack for the 2018 film I Feel Pretty.

Charts

Weekly charts

Year-end charts

Certifications

Release history

References

2016 singles
2015 songs
American contemporary R&B songs
Epic Records singles
Meghan Trainor songs
Music video controversies
Music videos directed by Hannah Lux Davis
Songs written by Jacob Kasher
Songs written by Jason Derulo
Songs written by Meghan Trainor
Songs written by Peter Svensson
Songs written by Ricky Reed
Sony Music singles